Pedro Paulo da Silva or simply Pedro Paulo (born 29 June 1985) is a Brazilian footballer who plays as a striker for Uberlândia.

Club career
He was loaned to Democrata GV-MG in 2006 season. In April 2007, he was loaned to ÖIS at Superettan. But in September 2007, he was loaned to Passense. In January 2008, he was moved to CRB for one-year loan, but loaned by CRB to Caldense for their Campeonato Mineiro 2008.

Contract

Atlético Mineiro 26 March 2007 to 31 December 2009

References

External links
CBF

1985 births
Living people
Brazilian footballers
Association football forwards
Clube Atlético Mineiro players
Esporte Clube Democrata players
Clube de Regatas Brasil players
Atlético Clube Goianiense players
Ipatinga Futebol Clube players
Duque de Caxias Futebol Clube players
Örgryte IS players
Brazilian expatriate footballers
Brazilian expatriate sportspeople in Sweden
Expatriate footballers in Sweden